Rugby League 2 is a sports game of Rugby League. It is the sequel to the 2002 Rugby League, and was released on 9 December 2005 for PlayStation 2 and Microsoft Windows, and in June 2006 for Xbox.

The title was developed by New Zealand company Sidhe and published in Australasia by Tru Blu Entertainment and in Europe by Alternative Software. New Zealand Warriors captain Steve Price is featured on the cover. The United Kingdom release features former St. Helens captain Paul Sculthorpe on the cover.

Features

Key improvements 

PlayStation 2/Microsoft Windows
Online multiplayer, allowing two players to play against each other in either a friendly match or a competitive "ranked" mode.
More teams and players, with updated statistics and team strips.
40 Stadiums.
Brand new gameplay features, including ball-stripping and pass-to-playmaker controls.
Multi-year franchise mode, manage team finances.
Massively upgraded graphics engine, allowing for more than 500 players.
Motion-captured animation from Weta Digital.
Highly customizable gameplay experience, with sliders and content editors that allow for considerable adjustment.
Xbox
Multiple save-slots available in Franchise and Competition modes.
Shoulder-barge, fend and sidestep controls additionally on right thumbstick.
Pause function disabled during ranked matches to prevent player exploiting this feature.
Autosave available in Competition and Franchise modes.
Graphical tweaks to improve the overall look and realism of the game.
Improvements to management of custom and customized players and teams.
New Zealand perform the Haka.

Gameplay Modes 
Instant ActionJump straight into a game with  random teams, pausing only to decide which team you want to play
Single GameSet all the details (such as teams, weather, stadium - etc.) before jumping into a one-off friendly match
CompetitionTake part in a full season of a popular competition or make up your own - includes multiplayer support, with the ability to play as 1 to all of the teams in the contest
Franchise ModeTen years back-to-back, with off-field management, player trading and representative competition spicing up the action
OnlineBoth friendly (no consequence) and ranked modes, allowing head-to-head multiplayer over the internet

Rugby League 2: World Cup Edition

See also

Rugby League (video game series)

References

External links
Sidhe Website
Official website
Home Entertainment Suppliers website

Windows games
Xbox games
PlayStation 2 games
2005 video games
2005 in rugby league
Video games developed in New Zealand
Rugby league video games
Video games set in Australia
Video games set in England
Video games set in France
Video games set in New Zealand
Multiplayer and single-player video games
Sidhe (company) games
Tru Blu Entertainment games
Alternative Software games